Melora a la Basilica is a 1000 unit collector's edition live recording made by American cello rock band Rasputina in Basilica Industria in Hudson, NY, "a behemoth of a defunct glue factory". It is a collection of previous Rasputina songs reworked with new second chair cellist Daniel DeJesus and covers of songs by Goldfrapp, Pearl Jam and the Sweeney Todd and A Clockwork Orange soundtracks. The sound and atmosphere of the record was patterned after the recitals given earlier in the year by Creager and DeJesus.

Track listing
 "Clowns" (Goldfrapp) – 4:12
 "American Girl" (Tom Petty) – 2:56
 "Wicked Dickie" (Adapted from "If It Wasn't for Dicky" by Lead Belly) – 2:28
 "I Want to Marry a Lighthouse Keeper" (A Clockwork Orange) – 1:03
 "Rose K." – 2:56
 "Why Don't You Do Right?" (Kansas Joe McCoy) – 1:59
 "Rusty the Skatemaker" – 3:28
 "Green Finch/Johanna" (Sweeney Todd) – 3:39
 "Girl Lunar Explorer" – 3:43
 "Soon Forget" (Pearl Jam) – 1:41
 "Identity Tokens / Wicked Dickie (hidden)" – 9:59

Personnel
Melora Creager – cello, vocals
Daniel DeJesus – 2nd chair cello

References

Rasputina (band) albums
2008 live albums